Arussaare (seldom written as Arusaare) is a village in Põhja-Sakala Parish, Viljandi County, in central Estonia. Arussaare lies on the right bank of the Retla River. At the 2011 Census, the settlement's population was 51.

Arussaare has been the location Arussaare state manor (Arrosaar). In 1854 the granary of the manor was given to local Orthodox congregation. 1871–1873 a new stone church was built on the site of the manor, and was dedicated to the Ascension of Christ. In 1920 a new cemetery was established beside the church.

In the northern part of the village's territory, there is an ancient offering stone and an offering spring (Uduallikas, "Fog Spring") located.

Gallery

References

Villages in Viljandi County
Kreis Fellin